Sitting Volleyball at the 2010 Asian Para Games were held in Guangwai Gymnasium from December 13 to December 18. There were 2 gold medals in this sport.

Medalists

Men's tournament

Preliminary round

Pool A

Pool B

Final round

Semi-finals

7-8th-place match

5-6th-place match

Bronze-medal match

Gold-medal match

Men's final standing

Women's tournament

Group round

Final round

Semi-finals

Bronze-medal match

Gold-medal match

Women's final standing

References

Volleyball results

2010 Asian Para Games events
Asian Para Games
2010 Asian Para Games
Sitting volleyball